Jón lærði Guðmundsson (1574–1658) was an Icelandic autodidact, poet, and alleged sorcerer. His poetry gives insight into contemporary Icelandic folklore.

Guðmundsson, who lived in Strandir, was considered a great master of magic in 17th century Iceland. He was said to have turned around the Turkish slave ships from the coasts of Iceland more than once, an achievement which gave him widespread fame, and was described in popular prints. He had to leave his home region and was tried for sorcery several times during the 1630s, but managed to avoid the death penalty every time.

References

External links 
 Jón Guðmundsson and his natural history of Iceland, on archive.org

1574 births
1658 deaths
17th-century Icelandic poets
People acquitted of witchcraft
Witch trials in Iceland